The 1998 Jordan League was a season of Jordan Premier League, the top-flight league for Jordanian association football clubs.  The season was abandoned before completion, and therefore no teams were relegated. A total of 10 teams participated.

League standings

References

Jordanian Pro League seasons
Jordan
Jordan
football